is a former Japanese football player.

Club statistics

References

External links

1980 births
Living people
Hannan University alumni
Association football people from Hyōgo Prefecture
Japanese footballers
J1 League players
J2 League players
Sanfrecce Hiroshima players
Vegalta Sendai players
Tokyo Verdy players
Fagiano Okayama players
Thespakusatsu Gunma players
Association football forwards